Darlene M. Soltys (born 1965), Associate Judge on the Superior Court of the District of Columbia
Nikolay Soltys, the 466th fugitive to be placed on the FBI's Ten Most Wanted list
Stanisław Sołtys, birth name of Stanisław Kazimierczyk (1433 – 1489), a Polish Roman Catholic priest

See also

Polish-language surnames
Surnames of German origin